Women in music refers to the role of women as composers, songwriters, instrumental performers, singers, conductors, music scholars, music educators, music critics/music journalists and other musical professions.

Women in music may also refer to:

 Women in Music (periodical), an American newsletter founded in July 1935
 Billboard Women in Music, an annual event held by Billboard
 International Alliance for Women in Music, an international membership organization of women and men 
 Women in Music Pt. III, a 2020 album by HAIM